The following are the national records in Olympic weightlifting in South Korea. Records are maintained in each weight class for the snatch lift, clean and jerk lift, and the total for both lifts by the Korea Weightlifting Federation.

Current records

Men

Women

Historical records

Men (1998–2018)

Women (1998–2018)

References

External links
Korea Weightlifting Federation
South Korean records  

records
South Korea
Olympic weightlifting
weightlifting